Denmark competed at the 1932 Summer Olympics in Los Angeles, United States. 43 competitors, 35 men and 8 women, took part in 34 events in 9 sports.

Medalists

Silver
Henry Hansen, Leo Nielsen, and Frode Sørensen — Cycling, Men's Team Road Race
Svend Olsen — Weightlifting, Men's Light Heavyweight
Abraham Kurland — Wrestling, Men's Greco-Roman Lightweight

Bronze
Peter Jørgensen — Boxing, Men's Light Heavyweight
Harald Christensen and Willy Gervin — Cycling, Men's 2.000m Tandem
Else Jacobsen — Swimming, Women's 200m Breaststroke

Athletics

Boxing

Cycling

Six cyclists, all men, represented Denmark in 1932.

Individual road race
 Frode Sørensen
 Leo Nielsen
 Henry Hansen
 Gunnar Andersen

Team road race
 Frode Sørensen
 Leo Nielsen
 Henry Hansen

Sprint
 Willy Gervin

Time trial
 Harald Christensen

Tandem
 Harald Christensen
 Willy Gervin

Diving

Fencing

Seven fencers, four men and three women, represented Denmark in 1932.

Men's foil
 Axel Bloch
 Ivan Osiier
 Erik Kofoed-Hansen

Men's team foil
 Axel Bloch, Aage Leidersdorff, Erik Kofoed-Hansen, Ivan Osiier

Men's épée
 Aage Leidersdorff
 Erik Kofoed-Hansen

Men's team épée
 Axel Bloch, Aage Leidersdorff, Erik Kofoed-Hansen, Ivan Osiier

Men's sabre
 Ivan Osiier
 Axel Bloch
 Aage Leidersdorff

Men's team sabre
 Ivan Osiier, Erik Kofoed-Hansen, Aage Leidersdorff, Axel Bloch

Women's foil
 Gerda Munck
 Grete Olsen
 Inger Klint

Swimming

Weightlifting

Wrestling

Art competitions

References

External links
Official Olympic Reports
International Olympic Committee results database

Nations at the 1932 Summer Olympics
1932
Summer Olympics